This is a list of 149 species in Rhyncolus, a genus of true weevils in the family Curculionidae.

Rhyncolus species

 Rhyncolus affinis Wollaston, T.V., 1861 c
 Rhyncolus angularis LeConte, 1858 i c
 Rhyncolus angustatus Boheman, 1838 c
 Rhyncolus angusticollis Reitter, E., 1896 c
 Rhyncolus angustus Fairmaire, L., 1859 c
 Rhyncolus appenhageni Uyttenboogaart, D.L., 1930 c
 Rhyncolus asperipennis Hustache, 1936 c
 Rhyncolus ater Motschulsky, V. de, 1866 c
 Rhyncolus australis Erichson, 1842 c
 Rhyncolus bhutanensis Osella, 1989 c
 Rhyncolus bonnairei Hoffmann, 1938 c
 Rhyncolus brachyrhinus Montrouzier, X., 1860 c
 Rhyncolus brevicornis Wollaston, T.V., 1873 c
 Rhyncolus brevis Boheman, 1845 c
 Rhyncolus brunneus Mannerheim, 1843 i c b
 Rhyncolus burgeoni Hustache, 1934 c
 Rhyncolus californicus Wollaston, T.V., 1873 c b
 Rhyncolus calvus Wollaston, T.V., 1860 c
 Rhyncolus capitulus Wollaston, T.V., 1858 c
 Rhyncolus carinatus Blatchley & Leng, 1916 c
 Rhyncolus castaneipennis Voss, 1956 c
 Rhyncolus caulium Wollaston, T.V., 1861 c
 Rhyncolus cercocarpus (Thatcher, 1940) i g b
 Rhyncolus chinensis Voss, 1953 c
 Rhyncolus chiriquensis Champion, G.C., 1909 c
 Rhyncolus chloropus Dejean, 1821 c
 Rhyncolus cloropus Germar, 1817 c
 Rhyncolus compressus Wollaston, T.V., 1860 c
 Rhyncolus corticalis Boheman, 1845 c
 Rhyncolus cossonoides Csiki, E., 1936 c
 Rhyncolus crassirostris Dejean, 1821 c
 Rhyncolus cribripennis Gräells, 1858 c
 Rhyncolus culinaris Dejean, 1821 c
 Rhyncolus curvistriatus Zherikhin in Zherikhin & Egorov, 1990 c
 Rhyncolus cylindricollis Wollaston, 1873 i c b
 Rhyncolus cylindricus Boheman, 1838 c
 Rhyncolus cylindrirostris Dejean, 1821 c
 Rhyncolus cylindrus Boheman, 1838 c
 Rhyncolus dalmatinus Desbr., 1892 c
 Rhyncolus depressus Csiki, E., 1936 c
 Rhyncolus dilatatus Casey, 1892 i c b
 Rhyncolus dilucidus Voss, 1953 c
 Rhyncolus discors Casey, 1892 i c b
 Rhyncolus dorsalis LeConte, 1858 i c
 Rhyncolus dufaui Hustache, 1932 c
 Rhyncolus ebeninus Csiki, E., 1936 c
 Rhyncolus elongatus Dejean, 1821 c g
 Rhyncolus elumbis Boheman, 1838 c
 Rhyncolus encaustes Boheman, C.H. in Schönherr, C.J., 1838 c
 Rhyncolus encaustus Boheman, 1838 c
 Rhyncolus euphorbiarum Wollaston, T.V., 1867 c
 Rhyncolus exiguus Boheman, 1838 c
 Rhyncolus fallax Csiki, E., 1936 c
 Rhyncolus falsosus Hoffmann, 1965 c
 Rhyncolus ferrugineus Waltl, 1839 c
 Rhyncolus filiformis Boheman, 1838 c
 Rhyncolus filum Chevrolat, L.A.A., 1880 c
 Rhyncolus fuscicollis Marshall, 1931 c
 Rhyncolus fusiformis Wollaston, T.V., 1873 c
 Rhyncolus globulipennis Chevrolat, c
 Rhyncolus gracilis Rosensch., 1856 c
 Rhyncolus grandicollis Ch. Bris. In Grenier, 1863 c
 Rhyncolus hervei Allard, 1868 c
 Rhyncolus himalayensis Stebbing, 1914 c
 Rhyncolus hispidulus Fairmaire, 1849 c
 Rhyncolus hispidus Csiki, E., 1936 c
 Rhyncolus hopffgarteni Stierlin, W.G., 1884 c
 Rhyncolus hustachei Csiki, E., 1936 c
 Rhyncolus incertus Osella, 1989 c
 Rhyncolus kathrynae Sleeper, 1968 c
 Rhyncolus kenyae Hustache, 1929 c
 Rhyncolus kivuanus Hustache, 1934 c
 Rhyncolus knowltoni (Thatcher, 1940) i g
 Rhyncolus laevis Hoffmann, 1965 c
 Rhyncolus laeviusculus Wollaston, T.V., 1873 c
 Rhyncolus latinasus Say, T., 1831 c
 Rhyncolus latitarsis Thomson, C.G., 1886 c
 Rhyncolus lauri Gyllenhal, 1838 c
 Rhyncolus laurineus Wollaston, T.V., 1861 c
 Rhyncolus lignarius Stephens, 1829 c
 Rhyncolus linearis Boheman, 1845 c
 Rhyncolus longicollis Boheman, 1838 c
 Rhyncolus longulus Boheman, C.H., 1859 c
 Rhyncolus macrops Buchanan, 1946 i c b
 Rhyncolus marginalis Csiki, E., 1936 c
 Rhyncolus maynei Hustache, 1934 c
 Rhyncolus meruensis Hoffmann, 1965 c
 Rhyncolus minor  b
 Rhyncolus minutulus Hoffmann, 1965 c
 Rhyncolus montivagus Champion, G.C., 1909 c
 Rhyncolus nigripes Reitter, E., 1901 c
 Rhyncolus nimius Casey, 1892 i c
 Rhyncolus nitidulus Boheman, 1838 c
 Rhyncolus nossibianus Hustache, 1922 c
 Rhyncolus obesulus Wollaston, T.V., 1867 c
 Rhyncolus obsoletus Fauv., c
 Rhyncolus opacus Karsch, 1881 i c
 Rhyncolus oregonensis Horn, 1873 i c b
 Rhyncolus oryzae Gyllenhal, 1838 c
 Rhyncolus pallens Casey, 1892 i c b
 Rhyncolus persimilis Hustache, 1933 c
 Rhyncolus piceus Stephens, 1831 c
 Rhyncolus plebejus Boheman, 1838 c
 Rhyncolus porcatus Schoenherr, 1838 c
 Rhyncolus praeustus Boheman, 1838 c
 Rhyncolus procer Boheman, 1838 c
 Rhyncolus protensus Wollaston, T.V., 1873 c
 Rhyncolus protractus Horn, G.H., 1873 c
 Rhyncolus pulvereus LeConte, 1850 c
 Rhyncolus punctatulus Dejean, 1821 c
 Rhyncolus punctatus Wollaston, T.V., 1873 c
 Rhyncolus puncticollis Dejean, 1821 c
 Rhyncolus punctulatus Lea, A.M., 1896 c
 Rhyncolus pyrenaeus Dufour, 1843 c
 Rhyncolus quercicolus Boheman, 1845 c
 Rhyncolus reflexus Boheman, 1838 c
 Rhyncolus regularis Hustache, 1932 c
 Rhyncolus relictus Casey, T.L., 1892 c
 Rhyncolus rufipennis Montrouzier, X., 1860 c
 Rhyncolus samoanus Marshall, 1931 c
 Rhyncolus schoenherri Hochhuth, 1847 c
 Rhyncolus schönherri Hochhuth, I.H., 1847 c
 Rhyncolus sculpturatus Waltl, 1839 c
 Rhyncolus similis Wollaston, T.V., 1873 c
 Rhyncolus simplicipes Wollaston, T.V., 1861 c
 Rhyncolus simulans Hoffmann, 1965 c
 Rhyncolus sitoniformis Zherikhin, 1992 c
 Rhyncolus spretus Casey, 1892 i c b
 Rhyncolus stacesmithi Sleeper, 1953 i c b
 Rhyncolus stlembus Schoenherr, c
 Rhyncolus strangulatus Perris, 1852 g
 Rhyncolus submuricatus Schoenherr, 1832 c
 Rhyncolus sulcatus Dejean, 1821 c
 Rhyncolus sulcipennis Wollaston, T.V., 1854 c
 Rhyncolus sulcirostris Dejean, 1821 c
 Rhyncolus syriacus Desbr., 1892 c
 Rhyncolus taciturnus Motschulsky, V. de, 1866 c
 Rhyncolus tenuirostris Creutzer, c
 Rhyncolus tenuis Gemminger, M., 1871 c
 Rhyncolus teretirostris Klug, 1834 c
 Rhyncolus thomsoni Grill, 1896 c
 Rhyncolus trivialis Boheman, 1838 c
 Rhyncolus troglodytes Boheman, 1838 c
 Rhyncolus truncorum Stephens, 1831 c
 Rhyncolus turbatus Reitter, E., 1887 c
 Rhyncolus ulkei Horn, G.H., 1873 c
 Rhyncolus usambaricus Voss, E., 1934 c
 Rhyncolus velutinus Dejean, 1821 c
 Rhyncolus winkleri Formánek, 1912 c

Data sources: i = ITIS, c = Catalogue of Life, g = GBIF, b = Bugguide.net

References

Rhyncolus
Articles created by Qbugbot